(At the grave), WAB 2, is an elegy composed by Anton Bruckner in 1861, for men's voices a capella.

History 
Am Grabe is a revised a cappella setting of the elegy Vor Arneths Grab, WAB 53. The elegy was performed on the funeral of Josephine Hafferl on 11 February 1861.

The original manuscript is stored in the archive of the Liedertafel Frohsinn.

In addition, an autograph slight revision of the song has been found on an undated copy of the manuscript (Mus.Hs. 2104).

Music 
The 21-bar-long, a cappella setting discarded the fourth strophe of Marinelli's text. The voice score of the first two strophes (bars 1-8) is almost identical to that of Vor Arneths Grab. The score of the third strophe is 5 bars longer. From bar 15 the score is different and ends at bars 19-21 alike bars 26-28 of the original setting.

A score with another text by Gottfried Grote has been issued by Schott Music in 1961.

There is also an arrangement by Jeff Reynolds for 4-part trombone ensemble (with optional contrabass trombone part).

Discography 
There is only one recording of the full setting of Am Grabe:
 Łukasz Borowicz, Anton Bruckner: Requiem, RIAS Kammerchor Berlin, Akademie für Alte Musik Berlin – CD: Accentus ACC30474, 2019 - revised version (Cohrs edition, based on manuscript Mus.Hs. 2104). 

NB: On CD LIVA 027, only the first two strophes were recorded.

References

Sources 
 August Göllerich, Anton Bruckner. Ein Lebens- und Schaffens-Bild,  – posthumous edited by Max Auer by G. Bosse, Regensburg, 1932
 Anton Bruckner – Sämtliche Werke, Band XXIII/2:  Weltliche Chorwerke (1843–1893), Musikwissenschaftlicher Verlag der Internationalen Bruckner-Gesellschaft, Angela Pachovsky and Anton Reinthaler (Editor), Vienna, 1989
 Cornelis van Zwol, Anton Bruckner 1824–1896 – Leven en werken, uitg. Thoth, Bussum, Netherlands, 2012. 
 Crawford Howie, Anton Bruckner - A documentary biography, online revised edition

External links 
 
 
 Am Grabe f-Moll, WAB 2 Critical discography by Hans Roelofs 
 Live performances on Youtube:
 Norihiko Inada with the Wagner Society Male Choir of Japan, 11 December 1988: Am Grabe, WAB 2 - using Gottfried Grote's text
 M. A. García de Paz with the Choir of the RTVE, 4 September 2022: Am Grabe at the 30th minute of Ciclo de Música Religiosa - Brahms, Mendelssohn, Rheinberger and Bruckner - using Marinelli's original text

Weltliche Chorwerke by Anton Bruckner
1861 compositions
Compositions in F minor